Gangnyi, Gangni, Gangnyixiang or Gangnixiang is a village and township-level division of Amdo County in the Nagqu Prefecture of the Tibet Autonomous Region, in China. The principal economic activity is animal husbandry, pastoral yak, goat, sheep, and so on.

Administrative divisions
The township-level division contains the following villages:

Longmu Village	(隆木村) 	
Dangguo Gangni Village (当果岗尼村) 
Nima Longmu Village	尼玛隆木村 	
Nanacha Village (纳那查村) 
Domar Miri Gongou Village	(多玛米日贡欧村) 	
Duozhuo Jiajiang Village (多卓加江村)

See also
List of towns and villages in Tibet

References

Township-level divisions of Tibet
Populated places in Nagqu